Spirama miniata is a species of moth of the family Erebidae. It is found in South Africa, where it has been recorded from KwaZulu-Natal.

References

Endemic moths of South Africa
Moths described in 1856
Spirama
Moths of Africa